New England-style hot dog buns, also often known as New England hot dog buns or top-loading hot dog buns, are the hot dog buns most commonly used in the United States region of New England and its cuisine. They may also be called split-top, top-sliced, frankfurter rolls, or frankfurt rolls.

History 

This style of roll or bun was developed in the 1940s by Howard Johnson's, who approached the Maine bakery J. J. Nissen in search of a bun for its fried clam strip sandwich. According to The Boston Globe, the "restaurant chain wanted top sliced rolls that would stand upright and be easier to prepare, serve, and eat." Outside of New England, they are associated with clam rolls and lobster rolls, dishes iconic to New England cuisine.

The New England-style bun predates the hot dog bun found almost everywhere else in the United States by at least several years. Before the invention of the New England bun, commercial bakers would slice rolls all the way through.

Today, this style of bun is prevalent in New England, with small and large grocery stores stocking at least several competing brands, and the hot dog bun typical of the rest of the United States (also called a "side-loading" bun) offered right alongside.

Overview 

In New England, hot dogs, clam rolls, lobster rolls, and the buns that accompany them are often associated with the summer months and coastal villages, where clam shacks and lobstering are common. Some recipes for these dishes explicitly require the use of a New England-style bun.

The rolls are baked very close together, keeping the sides soft, much like sliced bread. This makes them amenable to buttering, toasting and grilling.

Grocers in localities with significant tourism from New Englanders, such as some markets in Florida, will sell New England-style buns to satisfy visitors.

References 

New England cuisine
Howard Johnson's
Hot dogs
Buns